Burr Oak Cemetery is a cemetery located in Alsip, Illinois, United States, a suburb southwest of Chicago, Illinois. Established in 1927, Burr Oak was one of the few early Chicago cemeteries focused on the needs of the African-American community, it is the final resting place of many black celebrities, including Chicago blues musicians, athletes, and other notables.

History
The origins of Burr Oak Cemetery date back to when Ellis Stewart, secretary of the black-owned Supreme Liberty Life Insurance company, joined with Earl B. Dickerson, a prominent Chicago lawyer, to develop a cemetery that would meet the needs of the burgeoning African-American population in Chicago, a demographic change brought about by the great migration of blacks from the South during the early decades of the 20th century. Stewart had located a possible site for the cemetery just outside the Chicago city limits near Alsip, Illinois.  The owners of the land ultimately sold 40 acres for $50,000, $40,000 of which was loaned by the Roosevelt State Bank and the remainder raised by subscription.  The new group was incorporated as the Burr Oak Cemetery Association, and a suitable corpse was found in the morgue to legally dedicate the cemetery. Unfortunately, the Alsip townsfolk did not approve of a black cemetery next to the village and, "with the assistance of armed police", drove the burial party away.  The burial party eventually returned, however, with a deputy sheriff (courtesy of Robert E. Crowe the Republican state's attorney) and was successfully able to legally dedicate Burr Oak.

During the Great Depression, the Burr Oak Cemetery Association defaulted on the mortgage.  Dickerson again stepped in to help arrange for the black-owned Supreme Liberty Life Insurance company to buy the mortgage at roughly 10 cents to the dollar.  The re-constituted Chicago Burr Oak Cemetery Association eventually paid off the mortgage.  Dickerson later said that "saving that cemetery was one of the great achievements as a lawyer".

2009 scandal

Incident
On July 11, 2009, Cook County Sheriff Tom Dart alleged that four workers at Burr Oak cemetery dug up more than 200 graves, dumped the bodies into unmarked mass graves, and resold the plots in a scheme that went back at least five years. The three men and one woman were charged with one count each of dismembering a human body and face up to 30 years in prison.  Two men were convicted and sentenced to six and three year prison terms.

Investigation
Because of the investigation, the entire cemetery was declared a crime scene by the Cook County Sheriff's Office and temporarily closed to the public. The court-assigned receiver managing the cemetery had hoped to reopen it in September, but on October 13, 2009, visiting families found the cemetery still closed, with no statement on when it would reopen. The sheriff's office set up a searchable database with photographs of most headstones. The cemetery records were in great disarray, but the usable ones were computerized and turned over to the receiver for integration into the database.

A study of the records indicated that between 140,190 and 147,568 people were buried at Burr Oak. However, the cemetery has space for a maximum of 130,000 graves, and some areas appear never to have been used for burials. After burials resumed in November 2009, some human remains were found in areas that no one knew had been used. On May 24, 2011, a federal judge approved a plan to place the cemetery into a trust that would use about $2.6 million of a $7 million insurance settlement to renovate and run the cemetery. The judge set aside at least $50,000 for a memorial to honor those whose graves were lost or desecrated. Those who can prove they buried relatives in the cemetery will receive $100 per grave. Those whose relatives' graves were destroyed may apply for more money.

Notable burials

 James Kokomo Arnold (1901–1968), Musician.
 Ezzard Charles (1921–1975), Boxer, world heavyweight boxing champion.
 George "Sonny" Cohn (1925–2006), Musician, jazz trumpeter.
 Jimmie Crutchfield (1910–1993), All-Star Negro league baseball player.
 Earl B. Dickerson (1891–1986), a prominent attorney and community activist who successfully argued Hansberry v. Lee before the Supreme Court. Dickerson helped establish and preserve Burr Oak Cemetery.
 Willie Dixon (1915–1992), musician and songwriter.
 Annie Malone an African-American businesswoman, inventor and philanthropist. She was one of the first African American women to become a millionaire.
 John Donaldson (1892–1970), Baseball player, star pre-Negro league baseball pitcher and barnstormer businessman.
 Jodie Edwards (1895–1967), Comedian, member of the comedy duo Butterbeans and Susie.
 Blind Leroy Garnett (1897–1933), Musician, boogie-woogie and ragtime pianist and songwriter.
 Noble Drew Ali (1886–1929), founder of the Moorish Science Temple of America.
 Carl Augustus Hansberry (1895–1946), businessman and political activist, father of playwright Lorraine Hansberry.
 Big Walter Horton (1921–1981), American musician, blues harmonica player.
 Inman Jackson (1907–1973), basketball player, player with the Harlem Globetrotters.
 Roberta Martin (1907–1969), Gospel music singer, pianist, composer and founder of The Roberta Martin Singers.
 St. Louis Jimmy Oden (1903–1977), American blues vocalist and songwriter ("Goin' Down
 Graham T. Perry (1900–1960), Politician, one of the first African-Americans to serve as assistant attorney general for the State of Illinois, father of director Shauneille Perry and uncle of playwright Lorraine Hansberry.
 Otis Spann (1930–1970), musician, blues pianist.
 James A. "Candy Jim" Taylor (1884–1948), Negro league baseball player and manager.
 Mamie Till-Mobley (1921–2003) Activist, educator and mother of Emmett Till
 Emmett Till (1941–1955), Chicago teenager murder victim whose death helped galvanize the U.S. Civil Rights Movement.
 Ted "High-pockets" Trent (1903–1944), Negro league baseball player, pitcher.
 Dinah Washington (1924–1963), singer, known as the "Queen of the Blues".
 LeRoy Whitfield (1969–2005), one of the nation’s leading journalists reporting on AIDS among African-Americans.
 Billy Williams (1910–1972), African–American singer.
 J. Mayo Williams (1894–1980), Early blues and jazz record producer and one of the first African-American players in the NFL.
 Frank Reed (1954–2014), lead singer of The Chi-Lites.
 Rev. Dr. Clay Evans (1925–2019), Baptist Pastor & Civil Rights Leader 
 Harold Bradley Sr. (1905–1973), One of the first African-American players in the NFL.
 Tiny Topsy (1930–1964), R&B singer
 Barbara Acklin (1943–1998), Soul singer and songwriter

See also
 List of United States cemeteries

References

External links
 Official Burr Oak Cemetery site

Cemeteries in Illinois
Cemeteries in Cook County, Illinois
Funeral scandals
1927 establishments in Illinois
African-American cemeteries